

Seeds
A champion seed is indicated in bold text while text in italics indicates the round in which that seed was eliminated.

  Alberto Berasategui (quarterfinals)
  Gilbert Schaller (final)
  Álbert Costa (second round)
  Àlex Corretja (second round, withdrew)
  Carlos Costa (first round)
  Francisco Clavet (first round)
  Bohdan Ulihrach (second round)
  Jordi Arrese (first round)

Draw

External links
 1995 Valencia Open draw

Singles